The following highways are numbered 725:

Canada

Costa Rica
 National Route 725

United States